"Silhouette" is an instrumental by American smooth jazz saxophonist Kenny G, from his fifth studio album of the same name, which was released in 1988.

Chart performance
"Silhouette" peaked at No. 13 on the Billboard magazine Hot 100 chart, No. 2 on the Adult Contemporary chart, and No. 35 on the Hot R&B chart.

Personnel
 Kenny G – all other instruments, soprano saxophone
 Walter Afanasieff – keyboards
 Vail Johnson – bass guitar
 Peter Bunetta – bass drum

Production
 Producers – Kenny G.
 Engineers – Steve Smart; Gerry Brown.
 Mixing – Mick Guzauski.
 Design – Susan Mendola
 Hand Lettering – Bernie Maisner
 Photography – Rose Shoshana
 Management – Turner Management Group, Inc.

Charts

References

External links
 Kenny G's official Website

1988 singles
Kenny G songs
1980s instrumentals
1988 songs
Arista Records singles